David Cote or Côté may refer to:

 David M. Cote, chairman and CEO of Honeywell International
 David Cote (writer), theater editor and critic for Time Out New York, essayist, and blogger
 David Cote (politician), American politician 
 David Côté (politician), Canadian politician
 David Côté (Canadian football), Canadian football player